Paul Barth (born 20 September 1945) is a German former judoka who competed in the 1972 Summer Olympics.

References

1945 births
Living people
German male judoka
Olympic judoka of West Germany
Judoka at the 1972 Summer Olympics
Olympic bronze medalists for West Germany
Olympic medalists in judo
Medalists at the 1972 Summer Olympics
20th-century German people